Professor Dr. Jyoti Prakash Tamang (born 16 November 1961) is an Indian food microbiologist, working on fermented foods and alcoholic beverages of the Himalayan regions of India, Nepal and Bhutan and South East Asia for last 36 years and the Senior Professor in Microbiology of the Sikkim Central University. Known for his studies on fermented food, Prof. Tamang is an elected fellow of the Indian National Science Academy (FNA), National Academy of Science, India (NASI),National Academy of Agricultural Sciences, Indian Academy of Microbiological Sciences and the Biotech Research Society of India. The Department of Biotechnology of the Government of India awarded him the National Bioscience Award for Career Development, one of the highest Indian science awards, for his contributions to biosciences in 2004, and International Centre for Integrated Mountain Development (ICIMOD)-Mountain Chair (2019-2022). Prof. Tamang was nominated as Global Kimchi Ambassador by World Institute of Kimchi of Government of South Korea.

Biography 
Jyoti Prakash Tamang was born on 16 November 1961 in the mountain district of Darjeeling in the Indian state of West Bengal. He completed his schooling at Turnbull High School, Darjeeling in 1977 and class XII at the St Joseph's College, Darjeeling in 1979. His undergraduate education was at the Darjeeling Government College of North Bengal University from where he passed B.Sc. honors in 1982 and continued at the institution to earn an M.Sc. in microbiology in 1984, passing the examination winning a gold medal for academic excellence. He started his career in 1986 as an associate professor at the department of botany of Sikkim Government College, Tadong where he worked until 2011. Simultaneously, he enrolled at North Bengal University for his doctoral studies and after securing a PhD in microbiology in 1992, he did his post-doctoral work at two institutions abroad during 1994–95; first at the National Food Research Institute, Tsukuba with a fellowship from the United Nations University-Kirin Brewery Company and, later, at the Institute of Hygiene and Toxicology, Karlsruhe, on a fellowship received from Volkswagen Foundation. In 2011, he joined Central Sikkim University (CUS) as a member of faculty and has been serving the institution since then. He has held various positions at the university which included those of an academic coordinator, the dean of the School of Life Sciences, the registrar (the first registrar of the university) and a professor (presently the senior-most professor at CUS). He also serves as the officiating vice chancellor of the university. In between, he had a short stint at the Research Institute of Humanity and Nature of the Ministry of Education, Science and Technology, Kyoto as a visiting professor during 2009–10. He was also Visiting Professor in Chonbuk National University Hospital, Jeonju, South Korea and AIST, Tsukuba in Japan.

Legacy 

Professor Tamang is a pioneer researcher in ethnic fermented foods and beverages of the Himalayan regions of India, Nepal and Bhutan, and other Asian countries, which he scientifically studied and reported till date, focusing on food antiquity and culture, gastronomy, metataxonomic, metagenomics, metabolomics, bioinformatics, predictive functionality, starter culture development, food safety, probiotics, whole genome sequencing, nutrition, and health-benefits (as evident from his publications: https://scholar.google.com/citations?hl=en&user=TSawMGoAAAAJ) for last 36 years. The findings of Prof. Tamang have made significant paradigm shift from conventional microbial taxonomy to sequence-based taxonomy providing the information of many functional micro-/mycobiome in ethnic fermented foods and beverages of India. His studies have been documented by way of a number of articles and ResearchGate, an online repository of scientific articles has listed 36 of them. Besides, he has published seven books namely including Himalayan Fermented Foods: Microbiology, Nutrition, and Ethnic Values, Ethnic fermented foods and alcoholic beverages of Asia, Fermented foods and beverages of the world and Health benefits of fermented foods and beverages. Ethnic Fermented Foods and Alcoholic Beverages of India: Science History and Culture (2020) (Springer Nature).

Awards and honors 
Prof. Tamang received the Women's Association Award of the United Nations University in 1996. The Department of Biotechnology of the Government of India awarded him the National Bioscience Award for Career Development, one of the highest Indian science awards in 2005. He was elected as a Fellow of Biotech Research Society of India (2006), Fellow of Indian Academy of Microbiological Sciences (2010), Fellow of National Academy of Agricultural Sciences (2013), Fellow of Indian National Science Academy (2022) and Fellow of National Academy of Sciences, India (2022). He received the Gourmand World Cookbook Award in 2010. He is International Centre for Integrated Mountain Development (ICIMOD)-Mountain Chair (2019-2022).

Selected bibliography

Books 
1. Tamang, J.P. (2020). Ethnic Fermented Foods and Alcoholic Beverages of India: Science History and Culture. Springer Nature, Singapore, pages 685. .

2. Tamang, J. P., Holzapfel, W. H., Felis, G. E., Shin, D. H., eds. (2019). Microbiology of Ethnic Fermented Foods and Alcoholic Beverages of the World. Lausanne: Frontiers Media. doi: 10.3389/978-2-88963-165-0.

3. Tamang, J.P. (2016). Ethnic Fermented Foods and Alcoholic Beverages of Asia. Springer, New Delhi, pages 409. .

4. Tamang, J.P. (2015). Health Benefits of Fermented Foods and Beverages. CRC Press, Taylor & Francis Group, New York, pages 636. .

5. Tamang, J.P. (2010). Himalayan Fermented Foods: Microbiology, Nutrition, and Ethnic Values. CRC Press, Taylor & Francis Group, New York, pages 295. .

6. Tamang, J.P. and Kailasapathy, K. (Editors) (2010). Fermented Foods and Beverages of the World. CRC Press, Taylor & Francis Group, New York, pages 448. .

7. Tamang, J.P. (2005). Food Culture of Sikkim. Sikkim Study Series volume IV. Information and Public Relations Department, Government of Sikkim, Gangtok, p. 120.

Articles 
1.	1.	Pariyar, P., Yaduvanshi, P.S., Raghu, P. and Tamang, J.P. (2022). Screening of Poly-glutamic acid (PGA)-producing Bacillus species from Indian fermented soybean foods and characterization of PGA. Fermentation 8, 495.doi.org/10.3390/fermentation8100495.

2.	Tamang, J.P., Annupma, A. and Shangpliang, H.N.J. (2022). Ethno-microbiology of  Tempe, an Indonesian fungal-fermented soybean food and Koji, a Japanese fungal starter culture. Current Opinion in Food Science 100912. doi.org/10.1016/j.cofs.2022.100912.

3.	Tamang, J.P. (2022). Dietary culture and antiquity of the Himalayan fermented foods and alcoholic fermented beverages. Journal of Ethnic Foods 9:30 doi.org/10.1186/s42779-022-00146-3.
 
4.	Kharnaior, P. and Tamang, J.P. (2022). Metagenomic–metabolomic mining of kinema, a naturally fermented soybean food of the Eastern Himalayas. Frontiers in Microbiology 13: 868383. doi: 10.3389/fmicb.2022.868383.

5. Tamang, J.P. and Lama, S. (2022). Probiotic properties of yeasts in traditional fermented foods and beverages. Journal of Applied Microbiology. 1–10. .

6. Rai, R. and Tamang, J.P. (2022). In vitro and genetic screening of probiotic properties of lactic acid bacteria isolated from naturally fermented cow-milk and yak-milk products of Sikkim, India. World Journal of Microbiology and Biotechnology 38:25. .

7. Tamang, J.P., Das, D., Kharnaior, P., Pariyar, P., Thapa, N., Jo, S.W., Yim, E.J. and Shin, D.H. (2022). Shotgun metagenomics of   cheonggukjang, a fermented soybean food of Korea: community structure, predictive functionalities and amino acids profile. Food Research International 151, 110904. .

8. Tamang, J.P. (2021). “Ethno‐Microbiology” of ethnic Indian fermented foods and alcoholic beverages. Journal of Applied Microbiology. .

9. Tamang, J.P., Kharnaior, P., Pariyar, P., Thapa, N., Lar, N., Win, K.S., Mar, A. and Nyo, N. (2021). Shotgun sequence- based metataxonomic and predictive functional profiles of Pe poke, a naturally fermented soybean food of Myanmar. PLoS ONE 16(12): e0260777. .

10. Tamang, J.P., Jeyaram, K., Rai, A.K. and Mukherjee, P.K. (2021). Diversity of beneficial microorganisms and their functionalities in community-specific ethnic fermented foods of the Eastern Himalayas. Food Research International 148, 110633. .

11. Das, S. and Tamang, J.P. (2021). Changes in microbial communities and their predictive functionalities during fermentation of toddy, an alcoholic beverage of India. Microbiological Research 248: 126769.doi.org/10.1016/j.

12. Bhutia, M.O., Thapa, N. and Tamang, J.P. (2021). Prevalence of enterotoxin genes and antibacterial susceptibility pattern of pathogenic bacteria isolated from traditionally preserved fish products of Sikkim, India. Food Control 125: 108009. .

13. Shangpliang, H.N.K. and Tamang, J.P. (2021). Phenotypic and genotypic characterizations of lactic acid bacteria isolated from exotic naturally fermented milk (cow and yak) products of Arunachal Pradesh, India. International Dairy Journal 118:  105038. .

14. Kharnaior, P. and Tamang, J.P. (2021). Bacterial and fungal communities and their predictive functional profiles in kinema, a naturally fermented soybean food of India, Nepal and Bhutan. Food Research International 140, 110055. .

15. Bhutia, M.O., Thapa, N., Shangpliang, H.N.K. and Tamang, J.P. (2021). Metataxonomic profiling of bacterial communities and their predictive functional profiles in traditionally preserved meat products of Sikkim state in India. Food Research International 140, 110002. .

16. Bhutia, M.O., Thapa, N. and Tamang, J.P. (2021). Molecular characterisation of bacteria, detection of enterotoxin genes and antibiotic susceptibility patterns in traditionally processed meat products of Sikkim, India. Frontiers in Microbiology 11:599606. .

17. Pradhan, P. and Tamang, J.P. (2021). Probiotic properties of lactic acid bacteria isolated from traditionally prepared dry starters of the Eastern Himalayas. World Journal of Microbiology and Biotechnology 37, 7. .

18. Bhutia, M.O., Thapa, N., Shangpliang, H.N.K. and Tamang, J.P. (2021). High-throughput sequence analysis of bacterial communities and their predictive functionalities in traditionally preserved fish products of Sikkim, India. Food Research International 143, 109885. .

19. Anupma, A. and Tamang, J.P. (2020). Diversity of filamentous fungi isolated from some amylase and alcohol-producing starters of India. Frontiers in Microbiology 11: 905. .

20. Goel, A., Halami, P.M. and Tamang, J.P. (2020). Genome analysis of Lactobacillus plantarum isolated from some Indian fermented foods for bacteriocin production and probiotic marker genes. Frontiers in Microbiology 11: 40. .

21. Tamang, J.P., Cotter, P., Endo, A., Han, N.S., Kort, R., Liu, S.Q., Mayo, B., Westerik, N. and Hutkins, R. (2020). Fermented foods in a global age: east meets west. Comprehensive Reviews in Food Science and Food Safety 19: 184-217. .

22. Sha, S.P., Suryavanshi, M.S. and Tamang, J.P. (2019). Mycobiome diversity in traditionally prepared starters for alcoholic beverages in India by high-throughput sequencing method. Frontiers in Microbiology 10:348. .

23. Shangpliang, H.N.K., Rai, R., Keisam, S., Jeyaram, K. and Tamang, J.P. (2018). Bacterial community in naturally fermented milk products of Arunachal Pradesh and Sikkim of India analysed by high-throughput amplicon sequencing. Scientific Reports 8: 1532 .

See also 

 Food microbiology
 List of microorganisms used in food and beverage preparation
 List of fermented foods
 List of soy-based foods

Notes

References

External links 
 
 
 

N-BIOS Prize recipients
Heads of universities and colleges in India
Indian scientific authors
Living people
Indian biotechnologists
Indian microbiologists
Food technology
1961 births
Scientists from West Bengal
People from Darjeeling
Academic staff of Sikkim University
Fellows of the National Academy of Agricultural Sciences
University of North Bengal alumni